Hancunhe Town is a town situated on southern side of Fangshan District, Beijing, China. It borders Xiayunling, Zhoukoudian and Shilou Towns in the north, Liulihe Town in the east, Zhuozhou City and Changgou Town in the south, Dashiwo and Zhangfang Towns in the west. Its population was 37,435 as of 2020.

History

Administrative Divisions 

In 2021, Hancunhe Town had 28 subdivisions, more specifically 1 community and 27 villages:

See also 
 List of township-level divisions of Beijing

References 

Fangshan District
Towns in Beijing